Laeva River is a river in Tartu and Jõgeva County, Estonia. The river is 53.5 km long and basin size is 275.2 km2. It runs into Emajõgi.

References

Rivers of Estonia
Tartu County
Jõgeva County